Prin is a Greek weekly newspaper.

Prin or PRIN may also refer to
 PRIN (Partido Revolucionario de la Izquierda Nacionalista), a left-wing political party in Bolivia
 Novice Prin, a fictional Catkind, who was killed in the God Complex in Doctor Who (The God Complex)

Persons with the surname Prin 
 Alice Prin (1901–1953), a French artist model, nightclub singer, actress, memoirist, and painter
 Pancho Prin (1930–2003), a Venezuelan musician, singer, and composer
 Yves Prin (born 1933), a French composer and conductor of classical music

See also 
 PREN (Partido Renovador), a Panamanian right liberal political party
 Prins (disambiguation)
 Printz (disambiguation)
 Serzy-et-Prin, a commune in the Marne department in north-eastern France